Jack Earl Teele (June 17, 1930 – September 14, 2017) was an American football executive and sportswriter. He served as an executive for thirty-one seasons in the National Football League (NFL), including twenty-one with the Los Angeles Rams and ten with the San Diego Chargers, and two in the World League of American Football (WLAF) with the Barcelona Dragons.

Early life and education
Jack Teele was born on June 17, 1930, in Bloomington, Illinois. His family moved to Long Beach, California, in 1941. He was known for being one of the first students in the city to attend all levels of education there, having graduated from Garfield Elementary School, Washington Junior High, Long Beach Polytechnic High School, Long Beach City College, and Long Beach State University. He was a member of the Long Beach State men's basketball team, and played in their first ever season.

While a member of Long Beach City College in 1949, Teele started a sportswriting career with The Independent. After his graduation from college, he spent two years in the Army Intelligence, including thirteen months in Japan. He returned to United States in 1954, starting a local sports column in The Independent titled "Sports About Town". From 1958 to 1959, he covered the Los Angeles Rams in the newspaper.

Executive career

Los Angeles Rams
In , Teele was hired by the Los Angeles Rams as the director of publicity, replacing Bert Rose who became general manager of the Minnesota Vikings.

In the mid-1960s, Teele coined the phrase "Fearsome Foursome", to refer the Rams defensive line consisting of Deacon Jones, Merlin Olsen, Lamar Lundy, and Rosey Grier. "Everywhere we went, people asked me about our defensive line," Teele said in 2013. "So I decided we had to have a name." He nicknamed them the "Fearsome Foursome", and the name "immediately stuck," he said.

In , Teele had helped organize the first Super Bowl, booking the American Football League (AFL) champion Kansas City Chiefs into the Edgewater Hotel in Long Beach. He also secured the team practice space at Veterans Memorial Stadium, the sports field of Long Beach State University.

After serving nine seasons in the position of publicity director, owner Dan Reeves named him "assistant to the president", a position that had Teele second in command of the franchise. He succeeded Elroy "Crazylegs" Hirsch, who had become the director of athletics at the University of Wisconsin.

In , Teele was given the position of general manager, while retaining his job of assistant to the president. The Rams compiled a record of 9–4–1 that year, but missed the playoffs. Reeves, who Teele described as "the finest man I ever knew", died in 1971, and Teele was replaced by William Barnes as general manager, though he still remained with the team as the assistant to the president.

Later in the year, Long Beach State University named Teele its annual "alumnus of the year".

After the death of Dan Reeves, the Rams ownership shifted to Carroll Rosenbloom, who changed the position of Teele to "administrative assistant". In that role, he was in charge of the team's travel, room and food arrangements, and "myriad other details during training camp and the season." He served with the Rams under three different owners, six head coaches, and "umpteen different quarterbacks" during his twenty-one year stint with the organization.

San Diego Chargers
Shortly after resigning as Rams vice president of administration, Teele accepted an offer from the San Diego Chargers as assistant to the owner. In , he helped the Chargers acquire Hank Ilesic, and the North County Times reported his time "was well spent". He was fired by Chargers owner Alex Spanos in January .

Barcelona Dragons
After being let go by the Chargers, Teele became the chief executive officer of the Barcelona Dragons, a team in the newly formed World League of American Football (WLAF). He later served as their general manager in 1992 before the league suspended. He subsequently retired.

Death
Teele died on September 14, 2017, at the age of 87.

References

1930 births
2017 deaths
Long Beach State Beach men's basketball players
Sportswriters from California
American football executives
Los Angeles Rams executives
San Diego Chargers executives
NFL Europe executives
Sportspeople from Bloomington, Illinois